"Ironbottom Sound" (alternatively Iron Bottom Sound or Ironbottomed Sound or Iron Bottom Bay) is the name given by Allied sailors to the stretch of water at the southern end of The Slot between Guadalcanal, Savo Island, and Florida Island of the Solomon Islands, because of the dozens of ships and planes that sank there during the naval actions comprising the Battle of Guadalcanal during 1942–1943. Before the war, it was called Savo Sound. Every year on the battle's anniversary, a US ship cruises into the waters and drops a wreath to commemorate the men who lost their lives. For many Navy sailors, and those who served in the area during that time, the waters in this area are considered sacred, and strict silence is observed as ships cruise through.

Naval actions comprising the Battle of Guadalcanal 
 Battle of Savo Island, 9 August 1942
 Battle of Cape Esperance, 11–12 October 1942
 Naval Battle of Guadalcanal, 13–15 November 1942
 Battle of Tassafaronga, 30 November 1942
 Operation I-Go, 1–16 April 1943

Sunken ships

Japanese

Cape Esperance, 11–12 October 1942
  – 

First Naval Battle of Guadalcanal, 13 November 1942
  – 
  – 
  –

Second Naval Battle of Guadalcanal, 15 November 1942
  – Kongō-class battlecruiser
  – Fubuki-class destroyer
  – troop transport beached and then attacked by US bombers. These attacks set the transports afire and destroyed most equipment not unloaded before dawn. In September and October 1944, the wreck was used as a target for tests of the TDR-1 Drone by STAG-1 based at North Field on Banika, Russell Islands as part of the top secret project testing of America's first guided missile.
  – troop transport beached in Doma Cove

Tassafaronga, 30 November 1942
  –

Other surface battles and aerial actions, 1942–1943
  – ; lost to U.S. Navy air attack 4 May 1942
  – minesweeper; lost to U.S. Navy aerial torpedo attack 4 May 1942
  – military transport; ran aground and lost to air attack 15 October 1942
  – military transport; grounded and lost to air attack 15 November 1942
  – military transport; grounded and lost to air attack 15 November 1942
  – Type J1 submarine; torpedoed by USN PT Boat 9 December 1942
  – ; torpedoed by USN PT Boat 12 December 1942
  – Type J1 submarine; rammed by RNZN ASW Corvettes, ran aground 29 January 1943
  – Yūgumo-class destroyer; hit Mine while under attack by PT Boat 1 February 1943
  – military transport; attacked by the “Cactus Air Force” (later Air Sols) from Henderson Field 14 October 1942
  – military transport; attacked by the “Cactus Air Force” (later Air Sols) from Henderson Field 14 October 1942
  – military transport; attacked by the “Cactus Air Force” (later Air Sols) from Henderson Field 14 October 1942. Beached and becomes a total loss. She is also known as the Sasago Maru

Allied

Savo Island, 9 August 1942
  – US  heavy cruiser
  – US New Orleans-class heavy cruiser
  – US New Orleans-class heavy cruiser
  – Australian  heavy cruiser

Cape Esperance, 12 October 1942
  – US

First Naval Battle of Guadalcanal, 13 November 1942
  – US  light cruiser/anti-aircraft cruiser
  – US 
  – US 
  – US Benson-class destroyer
  – US Gleaves-class destroyer

Second Naval Battle of Guadalcanal, 15 November 1942
  – US Mahan-class destroyer
  – US 
  – US

Tassafaronga, 30 November 1942
  – US  heavy cruiser

Operation I-Go (Air Raid on Tulagi), 7 April 1943
  – US 
  – US Gleaves-class destroyer
  – New Zealand  corvette

Other surface battles and aerial actions, 1942–1945
  – US ; lost to air attack 8 August 1942
  – US ; sunk in aerial torpedo attack 9 August 1942
  – US Bagley-class destroyer; torpedoed by IJN destroyer 22 August 1942
  – US ; sunk in dive-bombing attack 30 August 1942
  – US Wickes-class destroyer; lost with Little in surface combat vs. IJN destroyers 5 September 1942
  – US Wickes-class destroyer; lost with Gregory in unnamed action vs. IJN destroyers 5 September 1942
  – US  oceangoing tug; lost with YP-284 to gunfire of IJN destroyers 25 October 1942
 YP-284 – US Yard Patrol craft; lost with Seminole to gunfire of IJN destroyers 25 October 1942
  – US Atlanta-class light cruiser/anti-aircraft cruiser; torpedoed by IJN submarine 13 November 1942
 PT-44 – US PT boat; lost in unnamed surface action vs. IJN destroyers 12 December 1942
 PT-112 – US PT boat; lost in surface combat vs. IJN destroyers 11 January 1943
  – US ; lost to dive-bombing attack 1 February 1943
 PT-37 – US PT boat; sunk with PT-111 by IJN destroyer 1 February 1943
 PT-111 – US PT boat; sunk with PT-37 by IJN destroyer 1 February 1943
 PT-123 – US PT boat; lost to air attack 1 February 1943
  – US attack transport; torpedoed in air attack 13 August 1943
  – United States Coast Guard–manned Liberty ship; exploded while loading depth charges 29 January 1945

See also 
 List of shipwrecks of Oceania

Notes

References

External links

 Casualties: U.S. Navy and Coast Guard Vessels, Sunk or Damaged Beyond Repair during World War II, 7 December 1941 – 1 October 1945 
 National Geographic: The Lost Fleet of Guadalcanal, Part 1, 2, 3, 4, 5, 6 
 

Bodies of water of the Solomon Islands
 
Sounds of Oceania
Ship graveyards